The 2005 South American Cross Country Championships took place on February 19–20, 2005.  The races were held at the Club de Golf del Uruguay in Montevideo, Uruguay.  A detailed report of the event was given for the IAAF.

Complete results results for junior and youth competitions, and medal winners were published.

Medallists

Race results

Senior men's race (12 km)

Note: Athletes in parentheses did not score for the team result.  (n/s: nonscorer)

Men's short race (4 km)

Note: Athletes in parentheses did not score for the team result.  (n/s: nonscorer)

Junior (U20) men's race (8 km)

Note: Athletes in parentheses did not score for the team result.  (n/s: nonscorer)

Youth (U18) men's race (4 km)

Note: Athletes in parentheses did not score for the team result.  (n/s: nonscorer)

Senior women's race (8 km)

Note: Athletes in parentheses did not score for the team result.  (n/s: nonscorer)

Women's short race (4 km)

Note: Athletes in parentheses did not score for the team result.  (n/s: nonscorer)

Junior (U20) women's race (6 km)

Note: Athletes in parentheses did not score for the team result.  (n/s: nonscorer)

Youth (U18) women's race (3 km)

Note: Athletes in parentheses did not score for the team result.  (n/s: nonscorer)

Medal table (unofficial)

Note: Totals include both individual and team medals, with medals in the team competition counting as one medal.

Participation
According to an unofficial count, 138 athletes from 10 countries participated.

 (36)
 (2)
 (19)
 (10)
 (6)
 (5)
 (8)
 Perú (7)
 (38)
 (7)

See also
 2005 in athletics (track and field)

References

External links
 GBRathletics

South American Cross Country Championships
South American Cross Country Championships
South American Cross Country Championships
South American Cross Country Championships
Cross country running in Uruguay
February 2005 sports events in South America